The 104th New York State Legislature, consisting of the New York State Senate and the New York State Assembly, met from January 4 to July 23, 1881, during the second year of Alonzo B. Cornell's governorship, in Albany.

Background
Under the provisions of the New York Constitution of 1846, 32 Senators and 128 assemblymen were elected in single-seat districts; senators for a two-year term, assemblymen for a one-year term. The senatorial districts were made up of entire counties, except New York County (seven districts) and Kings County (three districts). The Assembly districts were made up of entire towns, or city wards, forming a contiguous area, all within the same county.

At this time there were two major political parties: the Republican Party and the Democratic Party. The Republicans were split into two factions: the Stalwarts and the Half-Breeds. The Greenback Party also nominated a ticket.

Elections
The New York state election, 1880 was held on November 2. The only statewide elective office up for election was carried by a Republican. The approximate party strength at this election, as expressed by the vote for Chief Judge of the Court of Appeals, was: Republican 563,000; Democratic 518,000; and Greenback 13,000.

Sessions
The Legislature met for the regular session at the State Capitol in Albany on January 4, 1881; and adjourned on July 23.

George H. Sharpe (R) was re-elected Speaker, with 80 votes against 45 for Erastus Brooks (D).

On January 18, the Legislature elected Thomas C. Platt (R) to succeed Francis Kernan (D) as U.S. Senator from New York, for a term beginning on March 4, 1881.

On March 24, President James A. Garfield (Half-Breed) nominated President pro tempore of the State Senate William H. Robertson (Half-Breed) for the office of Collector of the Port of New York. The two U.S. Senators from New York, Roscoe Conkling and Platt (both Stalwarts) openly opposed the nomination, causing deadlock in the Senate which was evenly divided with 37 Republicans, 37 Democrats and two Independents. The office of Collector of the Port of New York was the most profitable federal office in the United States, and Conkling insisted in having a Stalwart appointed, but Garfield did not budge.

On May 16, Conkling and Platt resigned in protest, leaving the Republicans in the minority in the U.S. Senate. Conkling believed that they would be re-elected by the New York State Legislature and would thus show Garfield that they were in a balance of power position.

On May 18, Robertson was confirmed by the U.S. Senate as Collector.

On May 31, the Legislature began the special elections to fill the two vacant seats in the U.S. Senate.

On July 16, Congressman Warner Miller was elected on the 48th ballot to succeed Platt.

On July 22, Congressman Elbridge G. Lapham was elected on the 56th ballot to succeed Conkling, thus ending 53 days of deadlock, the second longest in the history of the New York Legislature. After the election, Robertson resigned his seat in the State Senate, to accept the office of Collector, and Dennis McCarthy was elected president pro tempore.

State Senate

Districts

 1st District: Queens and Suffolk counties
 2nd District: 1st, 2nd, 5th, 6th, 8th, 9th, 10th, 12th and 22nd Ward of the City of Brooklyn, and the towns of Flatbush, Gravesend and New Utrecht in Kings County
 3rd District: 3rd, 4th, 7th, 11th, 13th, 19th, 20th, 21st and 23rd Ward of the City of Brooklyn
 4th District: 14th, 15th, 16th, 17th, 18th, 24th and 25th Ward of the City of Brooklyn, and the towns of New Lots and Flatlands in Kings County
 5th District: Richmond County and the 1st, 2nd, 3rd, 5th, 6th, 8th, 14th and parts of the 4th and 9th Ward of New York City
 6th District: 7th, 11th, 13th and part of the 4th Ward of NYC
 7th District: 10th, 17th and part of the 15th, 18th and 21st Ward of NYC
 8th District: 16th and part of the 9th, 15th, 18th, 20th and 21st Ward of NYC
 9th District: Part of the 18th, 19th and 21st Ward of NYC
 10th District: Part of the 12th, 19th, 20th, 21st and 22nd Ward of NYC
 11th District: 23rd and 24th, and part of the 12th, 20th and 22nd Ward of NYC
 12th District: Rockland and Westchester counties
 13th District: Orange and Sullivan counties
 14th District: Greene, Schoharie and Ulster counties
 15th District: Columbia, Dutchess and Putnam counties
 16th District: Rensselaer and Washington counties
 17th District: Albany County
 18th District: Fulton, Hamilton, Montgomery, Saratoga and Schenectady counties
 19th District: Clinton, Essex and Warren counties
 20th District: Franklin, Lewis and St. Lawrence counties
 21st District: Oswego and Jefferson counties
 22nd District: Oneida County
 23rd District: Herkimer, Madison and Otsego counties
 24th District: Chenango, Delaware and Broome counties
 25th District: Onondaga and Cortland counties
 26th District: Cayuga, Seneca, Tompkins and Tioga counties
 27th District: Allegany, Chemung and Steuben counties
 28th District:  Ontario, Schuyler, Wayne and Yates counties
 29th District: Monroe and Orleans counties
 30th District: Genesee, Livingston, Niagara and Wyoming counties
 31st District: Erie County
 32nd District: Cattaraugus and Chautauqua counties

Note: There are now 62 counties in the State of New York. The counties which are not mentioned in this list had not yet been established, or sufficiently organized, the area being included in one or more of the abovementioned counties.

Members
The asterisk (*) denotes members of the previous Legislature who continued in office as members of this Legislature.

Employees
 Clerk: John W. Vrooman
 Sergeant-at-Arms: John W. Corning
 Doorkeeper: James G. Caw
 Stenographer: Hudson C. Tanner

State Assembly

Assemblymen
The asterisk (*) denotes members of the previous Legislature who continued as members of this Legislature.

Employees
 Clerk: Edward M. Johnson
 Sergeant-at-Arms: Sidney M. Robinson
 Doorkeeper: Henry Wheeler
 First Assistant Doorkeeper: Michael Maher
 Second Assistant Doorkeeper: John W. Wheeler
 Stenographer: Worden E. Payne

Notes

Sources
 Civil List and Constitutional History of the Colony and State of New York compiled by Edgar Albert Werner (1884; see pg. 276 for Senate districts; pg. 291 for senators; pg. 298–304 for Assembly districts; and pg. 379f for assemblymen)
 THE NEW ASSEMBLY in NYT on November 4, 1880
 GEN. SHARPE THE SPEAKER in NYT on January 4, 1881

104
1881 in New York (state)
1881 U.S. legislative sessions